Rio Verde Pequeno (Portuguese for "little green river") It is a tributary of the Rio Verde, it demarcates the border between the States of Minas Gerais and Bahia in eastern Brazil.

See also
List of rivers of Bahia

References

Brazilian Ministry of Transport

Rivers of Bahia